Narayanaswamy Srinivasan (born 1962) was an Indian molecular biophysicist and a professor and the head of Proteins: Structure, Function and Evolutionary Group (N. S. Group) at the Molecular Biophysics Unit  of the Indian Institute of Science. He is known for his researches in the fields of computational genomics and protein structure analysis. An elected fellow of the Indian Academy of Sciences and the National Academy of Sciences, India, he is a J. C. Bose National fellow of the Department of Biotechnology and a recipient of the National Bioscience Award for Career Development of the Department of Science and Technology. The Council of Scientific and Industrial Research, the apex agency of the Government of India for scientific research, awarded him the Shanti Swarup Bhatnagar Prize for Science and Technology, one of the highest Indian science awards, in 2007, for his contributions to biological sciences.

Biography 
N. Srinivasan, born on the April Fool's Day of 1962 in Chennai in the south Indian state of Tamil Nadu, graduated in physics from the University of Madras in 1982 and continued at the university to complete his master's degree in biophysics at the Department of Crystallography and Biophysics in 1984. Joining the Indian Institute of Science (IISc), he secured a PhD in 1991 for his thesis, Conformational studies on globular proteins: Data analysis, and served as a senior research fellow at IISc, assisting Padmanabhan Balaram, a noted biochemist and Padma Bhushan recipient. His stint at Balaram's laboratory lasted only 10 months and in October 1991, he moved to the Department of Crystallography at Birkbeck College to work with Tom Blundell and stayed there till 1994 when he shifted his base to Ludwig Institute for Cancer Research where he had the opportunity to work under Mike Waterfield. Two years later, he was reunited with Tom Blundell at the Department of Biochemistry of the University of Cambridge and completed his post-doctoral studies there in May 1998.

Srininvasan returned to India the same year and joined the Indian Institute of Science to serve at the Molecular Biophysics Unit (MBU) as an assistant professor and a senior fellow of the Wellcome Trust. In 2010, he was promoted as a professor and he heads the Proteins : Structure, Function and Evolutionary Group, popularly known as N. S. Group, of the MBU. In between, he served as an honorary research fellow at Birkbeck College from 1998 to 2000 and is a visiting professor at University of La Réunion (since 2004), a senior fellow at Manchester University (since 2008) and a visiting professor of Bioinformatics at University of Nantes (July 2012).

Legacy 
Srinivasan's researches were broadly on protein evolution with regard to its structure, functions and interactions. He worked on cellular signal transduction pathways and proteins involved in the process through modeling and computational studies. Deploying computational genomics, he is known to have assisted in identifying similar proteins with shared structural and functional features. His research findings have been published in several articles; online article repositories such as Google Scholar and ResearchGate have listed 345 and 391 of his articles respectively. He has been granted patents for two of his inventions related to nucleotide sequences. His ongoing project, Multi-macromolecular assemblies, relates to 3-D structures of large macromolecular machines.

Srinivasan is a former member of the committee on Affiliates and Special Interests Group of the International Society for Computational Biology (ISCB) and a member of the Structural Biology and Structural Genomics section of the Faculty of 1000. He is associated with several science journals; as an editorial board member with Bioinformatics, PLoS ONE, F1000 Research, International Journal of Bioinformatics Research and Applications, Research and Reviews in Biosciences, Resonance, In Silico Biology, Scientific World Journal, Biology Direct and Scientific Reports; as an associate editor at International Journal of Knowledge Discovery in Bioinformatics and Bioinformation and as a guest editor with PLoS Computational Biology, Journal of Biosciences, Progress in Biophysics and Molecular Biology and Current Opinions in Structural Biology.(ongoing). He was associated with PRIB 2007, an international conference on Pattern Recognition In Bioinformatics, held in Singapore in 2007 as a member of the program committee and has delivered several featured lectures and keynote addresses which included the Keystone Symposium on Multiprotein Complexes (Cambridge 2006), and Asia-Pacific Bioinformatics Conference (Melbourne 2012). On the academic front, he has served as the thesis examiner for a number of Indian universities and as the coordinator of integrated doctoral and BS programs in Biology of Indian Institute of Science. He also sits in the Scientific Advisory Board of Jubilant Biosys, a research and development firm involved in drug discovery services.

Awards and honors 
The Department of Biotechnology of India awarded Srinivasan the National Bioscience Award for Career Development in 2004. The year 2007 brought him the Shanti Swarup Bhatnagar Prize, one of the highest Indian science awards, as well as the elected fellowship of the Indian Academy of Sciences and the National Academy of Sciences, India. He also holds the Honorary Research Fellowship of Birkbeck College and the International Senior Fellowship of the Wellcome Trust.

Selected bibliography

Patents

See also 
 Computational genomics
 Protein structure
 Nucleic acid sequence

Notes

References

External links 
 
 

Recipients of the Shanti Swarup Bhatnagar Award in Biological Science
1962 births
Scientists from Chennai
University of Madras alumni
Indian Institute of Science alumni
Academics of Birkbeck, University of London
Fellows of the Indian Academy of Sciences
Fellows of The National Academy of Sciences, India
N-BIOS Prize recipients
Tamil academics
Living people
20th-century Indian biologists